Enrique Castellón Vargas (7 April 1928 – 22 April 2020), better known as El Príncipe Gitano ("The Gypsy Prince") was a Spanish flamenco singer, actor and dancer. He was the brother of rumba singer Dolores Vargas "La Terremoto".

Career
At the age of 14 he made his debut at the Teatro Calderón in Madrid in the same show as Lola Flores and very soon after he performed his first show, “Pinceladas”, becoming a great figure in Spanish song in the 1950s, despite the fact that his real passion was bullfighting, but he did not have success in that field.

His most famous song is "Obí, obá". He also made a peculiar version of the Elvis Presley song "In the Ghetto".

He died due to COVID-19 during the COVID-19 pandemic in Spain.

Filmography
Brindis al cielo (1954)
Un heredero en apuros (1956)
Veraneo en España (1956)
El alma de la copla (1965)
El milagro del cante (1967)
Españolear (1969)

References

External links
 
 

1928 births
2020 deaths
20th-century Spanish male singers
20th-century Spanish singers
Deaths from the COVID-19 pandemic in Spain